The 2019 United States state legislative elections were held on November 5, 2019. Seven legislative chambers in four states held regularly-scheduled elections. These off-year elections coincided with other state and local elections, including gubernatorial elections in three states.

Democrats gained majorities of both houses of the Virginia General Assembly, giving them complete control of the legislature for the first time since 2000, and the first trifecta since 1994.

Summary table 
Regularly-scheduled elections were held in 7 of the 99 state legislative chambers in the United States. Nationwide, regularly-scheduled elections were held for 538 of the 7,383 legislative seats. This table only covers regularly-scheduled elections; additional special elections took place concurrently with these regularly-scheduled elections.

State summaries

Louisiana 

All seats of the Louisiana State Senate and the Louisiana House of Representatives were up for election to four-year terms in single-member districts. Republicans retained majority control in both chambers.

Mississippi 
All seats of the Mississippi State Senate and the Mississippi House of Representatives were up for election to four-year terms in single-member districts. Republicans retained majority control in both chambers.

New Jersey 

All seats of the New Jersey General Assembly were up for election to two-year terms in coterminous two-member districts. The New Jersey Senate did not hold regularly-scheduled elections. Democrats maintained majority control in the lower house.

Virginia 

All seats of the Senate of Virginia and the Virginia House of Delegates were up for election in single-member districts. Senators were elected to four-year terms, while delegates serve terms of two years. Democrats gained control of both legislative chambers, establishing the first Democratic trifecta in Virginia since 1993.

Special elections 
Various states held special elections for legislative districts throughout the year. Overall, Republicans flipped five seats, Democrats flipped two, and one independent was elected.

Alabama 
Two special elections were held for the Alabama Legislature in 2019.
 House District 42: Republican Ivan Smith was elected on November 5, 2019, to succeed Republican Jimmy Martin, who died on May 31, 2019, of cancer.
 House District 74: Republican Charlotte Meadows was elected on November 12, 2019, to succeed Republican Dimitri Polizos, who died on March 27, 2019, of a heart attack.

Arkansas 
One special election was held for the Arkansas General Assembly in 2019.
 House District 36: Democrat Denise Jones Ennett was elected in a runoff on September 3, 2019, to succeed Democrat Charles Blake, who resigned on May 16, 2019, to take a job with Mayor of Little Rock Frank Scott Jr.

California 

Three special elections were held for the California State Legislature in 2019.
 Senate District 1: Republican Brian Dahle was elected in a runoff on June 4, 2019, to succeed Republican Ted Gaines, who resigned on January 7, 2019, after he was elected to the California State Board of Equalization.
 Senate District 33: Democrat Lena Gonzalez was elected in a runoff on June 4, 2019, to succeed Democrat Ricardo Lara, who resigned on January 7, 2019, after he was elected California Insurance Commissioner.
 Assembly District 1: Republican Megan Dahle was elected in a runoff on November 5, 2019, to succeed Republican Brian Dahle, who resigned on June 12, 2019, after he was elected to the California State Senate.

Connecticut 
Seven special elections were held for the Connecticut General Assembly in 2019. Republicans flipped two seats previously held by Democrats.
 Senate District 3: Democrat Saud Anwar was elected on February 26, 2019, to succeed Democrat Tim Larson, who resigned in January 2019 after he was appointed Executive Director of the Connecticut Office of Higher Education by Governor Ned Lamont.
 Senate District 5: Democrat Derek Slap was elected on February 26, 2019, to succeed Democrat Beth Bye, who resigned on January 9, 2019, after she was appointed Commissioner of the Connecticut Office of Early Childhood by Governor Ned Lamont.
 Senate District 6: Republican Gennaro Bizzarro was elected on February 26, 2019, to succeed Democrat Terry Gerratana, who resigned in January 2019 after she was appointed to the Connecticut Office of Health Strategy by Governor Ned Lamont.
 House District 19: Democrat Tammy Exum was elected on April 16, 2019, to succeed Democrat Derek Slap, who resigned on February 28, 2019, after he was elected to the Connecticut State Senate.
 House District 39: Democrat Anthony Nolan was elected on February 26, 2019, to succeed Democrat Chris Soto, who resigned in January 2019 after he was appointed Director of Legislative Affairs by Governor Ned Lamont.
 House District 99: Republican Joseph Zullo was elected on February 26, 2019, to succeed Democrat James Albis, who resigned in January 2019.
 House District 130: Democrat Antonio Felipe was elected on May 7, 2019, to succeed Democrat Ezequiel Santiago, who died on March 15, 2019, of a heart attack.

Florida 
Two special elections were held for the Florida Legislature in 2019.
 House District 7: Republican Jason Shoaf was elected on June 18, 2019, to succeed Republican Halsey Beshears, who resigned on January 11, 2019, after he was appointed Secretary of the Florida Department of Business and Professional Regulation by Governor Ron DeSantis.
 House District 38: Republican Randy Maggard was elected on June 18, 2019, to succeed Republican Danny Burgess, who resigned on January 24, 2019, after he was appointed Executive Director of the Florida Department of Veterans Affairs by Governor Ron DeSantis.

Georgia 
Five special elections were held for the Georgia General Assembly in 2019.
 House District 5: Republican Matt Barton was elected in a runoff on February 5, 2019, to succeed Republican John Meadows III, who died on November 13, 2018, of cancer.
 House District 28: Republican Chris Erwin was elected on April 9, 2019, to succeed a vacant term after the results of the December 2018 special election were deemed inconclusive.
 House District 71: Republican Philip Singleton was elected in a runoff on October 1, 2019, to succeed Republican David Stover, who resigned on June 25, 2019, citing personal reasons.
 House District 152: Republican Bill Yearta was elected in a runoff on December 3, 2019, to succeed Republican Ed Rynders, who resigned on September 5, 2019, citing health reasons.
 House District 176: Republican James Burchett was elected in a runoff on March 12, 2019, to succeed Republican Jason Shaw, who resigned on January 1, 2019, after he was appointed to the Georgia Public Service Commission by Governor Nathan Deal.

Iowa 

Two special elections were held for the Iowa General Assembly in 2019.
 Senate District 30: Democrat Eric Giddens was elected on March 19, 2019, to succeed Democrat Jeff Danielson, who resigned on February 14, 2019, to become a lobbyist for the American Wind Energy Association.
 House District 46: Democrat Ross Wilburn was elected on August 6, 2019, to succeed Democrat Lisa Heddens, who resigned on June 17, 2019, after she was appointed to the Story County Board of Supervisors.

Kentucky 

Three special elections were held for the Kentucky General Assembly in 2019. Republicans flipped one seat previously held by a Democrat.
 Senate District 31: Republican Phillip Wheeler was elected on March 5, 2019, to succeed Democrat Ray Jones, who resigned on January 7, 2019, after he was elected Judge/Executive of Pike County.
 House District 18: Republican Samara Heavrin was elected on November 5, 2019, to succeed Republican Tim Moore, who resigned on September 10, 2019, citing a belief in term limits.
 House District 63: Republican Kimberly Banta was elected on November 5, 2019, to succeed Republican Diane St. Onge, who resigned on August 12, 2019, citing personal reasons.

Louisiana 
Seven special elections were held for the Louisiana State Legislature in 2019. An independent was elected in one seat previously held by a Republican.
 House District 12: Republican Chris Turner was elected on February 23, 2019, to succeed Republican Rob Shadoin, who resigned in September 2018 to serve as deputy counsel in the Louisiana Department of Wildlife and Fisheries.
 House District 17: Democrat Pat Moore was elected in a runoff on March 30, 2019, to succeed Democrat Marcus Hunter, who resigned after he was elected to judge of the Fourth Judicial District Court.
 House District 18: Democrat Jeremy LaCombe was elected in a runoff on March 30, 2019, to succeed Democrat Major Thibaut, who resigned on December 31, 2018, to serve as president of Pointe Coupee Parish.
 House District 26: Democrat Ed Larvadain was elected on February 23, 2019, to succeed Democrat Jeff Hall, who resigned on December 4, 2018, after he was elected mayor of Alexandria.
 House District 27: Republican Mike T. Johnson was elected on February 23, 2019, to succeed Republican Lowell Hazel, who resigned after he was elected to judge of the Ninth Judicial District Court.
 House District 47: Republican Ryan Bourriaque was elected on February 23, 2019, to succeed Republican Bob Hensgens, who resigned on December 10, 2018, after he was elected to the Louisiana State Senate.
 House District 62: Independent Roy Adams was elected in a runoff on March 30, 2019, to succeed Republican Kenny Havard, who resigned on December 10, 2018, to serve as president of West Feliciana Parish.

Maine 
Three special elections were held for the Maine Legislature in 2019.
 House District 45: Democrat Stephen Moriarty was elected on June 11, 2019, to succeed Democrat Dale Denno, who resigned on March 27, 2019, following a diagnosis of lung cancer.
 House District 52: Democrat Sean Paulhus was elected on April 2, 2019, to succeed Democrat Jennifer DeChant, who resigned on February 1, 2019, to take a job in the private sector.
 House District 124: Democrat Joe Perry was elected on March 12, 2019, to succeed Democrat Aaron Frey, who resigned on December 5, 2018, after he was appointed Maine Attorney General by the Maine Legislature.

Minnesota 

Two special elections were held for the Minnesota Legislature in 2019. Republicans flipped one seat previously held by a Democrat.
 Senate District 11: Republican Jason Rarick was elected on February 5, 2019, to succeed Democrat Tony Lourey, who resigned on January 3, 2019, after he was appointed Commissioner of Human Services by Governor Tim Walz.
 House District 11B: Republican Nathan Nelson was elected on March 19, 2019, to succeed Republican Jason Rarick, who resigned on February 12, 2019, after he was elected to the Minnesota Senate.

Mississippi 
Three special elections were held for the Mississippi Legislature in 2019.
 House District 32: Democrat Solomon Osborne was elected on March 12, 2019, to succeed Democrat Willie Perkins Sr., who resigned after he was elected chancery judge in Leflore, Quitman, and Tallahatchie and Tunica counties.
 House District 71: Democrat Ronnie Crudup Jr. was elected on March 12, 2019, to succeed Democrat Adrienne Wooten, who resigned after she was elected Hinds County circuit judge.
 House District 101: Republican Kent McCarty was elected in a runoff on April 2, 2019, to succeed Republican Brad Touchstone, who resigned after he was elected Lamar County circuit judge.

Missouri 
Six special elections were held for the Missouri General Assembly in 2019. Democrats flipped one seat previously held by a Republican.
 House District 22: Democrat Yolanda Young was elected on November 5, 2019, to succeed Democrat Brandon Ellington, who resigned on July 31, 2019, after he was elected to the Kansas City, Missouri City Council.
 House District 36: Democrat Mark Sharp was elected on November 5, 2019, to succeed Democrat DaRon McGee, who resigned on April 29, 2019, following allegations of sexual harassment.
 House District 74: Democrat Mike Person was elected on November 5, 2019, to succeed Democrat Cora Walker, who resigned on July 29, 2019, to work as a policy director for St. Louis County Executive Sam Page.
 House District 78: Democrat Rasheen Aldridge Jr. was elected on November 5, 2019, to succeed Democrat Bruce Franks Jr., who resigned on July 31, 2019, citing mental health reasons.
 House District 99: Democrat Trish Gunby was elected on November 5, 2019, to succeed Republican Jean Evans, who resigned on February 5, 2019, to become the executive director of the Missouri Republican Party.
 House District 158: Republican Scott Cupps was elected on November 5, 2019, to succeed Republican Scott Fitzpatrick, who resigned on January 14, 2019, after he was appointed State Treasurer of Missouri by Governor Mike Parson.

New Hampshire 
One special election was held for the New Hampshire General Court in 2019.
 House District Rockingham 9: Republican Michael Vose was elected on October 8, 2019, to succeed Republican Sean Morrison, who resigned in May 2019, citing lack of cooperation.

New Jersey 
One special election was held for the New Jersey Legislature in 2019. Republicans flipped one seat previously held by a Democrat.
 Senate District 1: Republican Mike Testa was elected on November 5, 2019, to succeed Democrat Jeff Van Drew, who resigned on December 31, 2018, after he was elected to the United States House of Representatives.

New York 
One special election was held for the New York State Legislature in 2019.
 Senate District 57: Republican George Borrello was elected on November 5, 2019, to succeed Republican Catharine Young, who resigned on March 10, 2019, to become Executive Director for the Center of Excellence in Food and Agriculture at Cornell AgriTech.

Pennsylvania 

Seven special elections were held for the Pennsylvania General Assembly in 2019. Democrats flipped one seat previously held by a Republican.
 Senate District 33: Republican Doug Mastriano was elected on May 21, 2019, to succeed Republican Richard Alloway, who resigned on February 28, 2019, citing political gridlock.
 Senate District 37: Democrat Pam Iovino was elected on April 2, 2019, to succeed Republican Guy Reschenthaler, who resigned on January 3, 2019, after he was elected to the United States House of Representatives.
 Senate District 41: Republican Joe Pittman was elected on May 21, 2019, to succeed Republican Donald C. White, who resigned on February 28, 2019, citing health reasons.
 House District 11: Republican Marci Mustello was elected on May 21, 2019, to succeed Republican Brian Ellis, who resigned on March 18, 2019, following allegations of sexual assault.
 House District 85: Republican David H. Rowe was elected on August 20, 2019, to succeed Republican Fred Keller, who resigned on May 22, 2019, after he was elected to the United States House of Representatives.
 House District 114: Democrat Bridget Malloy Kosierowski was elected on March 12, 2019, to succeed Democrat Sid Michaels Kavulich, who died on October 16, 2018, due to heart surgery complications.
 House District 190: Democrat Movita Johnson-Harrell was elected on March 12, 2019, to succeed Democrat Vanessa L. Brown, who resigned on December 11, 2018, after she was convicted of bribery and conflict of interest.

Rhode Island 
One special election was held for the Rhode Island General Assembly in 2019.
 House District 68: Democrat June Speakman was elected on March 5, 2019, to succeed Democratic Representative-elect Laufton Ascencao, who did not take office after admitting to faking his campaign invoice.

South Carolina 
Four special elections were held for the South Carolina General Assembly in 2019.
 Senate District 6: Republican Dwight Loftis was elected on March 26, 2019, to succeed Republican William Timmons, who resigned on November 9, 2018, after he was elected to the United States House of Representatives.
 House District 14: Republican Stewart Jones was elected on April 23, 2019, to succeed Republican Michael Pitts, who resigned on January 3, 2019, citing health reasons.
 House District 19: Republican Patrick Haddon was elected on August 20, 2019, to succeed Republican Dwight Loftis, who resigned on March 27, 2019, after he was elected to the South Carolina Senate.
 House District 84: Republican Melissa Lackey Oremus was elected on October 1, 2019, to succeed Republican Ronnie Young, who died on May 19, 2019, of pancreatic cancer.

Tennessee 
Three special elections were held for the Tennessee General Assembly in 2019.
 Senate District 22: Republican Bill Powers was elected on April 23, 2019, to succeed Republican Mark E. Green, who resigned on November 1, 2018, after he was elected to the United States House of Representatives.
 Senate District 32: Republican Paul Rose was elected on March 12, 2019, to succeed Republican Mark Norris, who resigned on November 1, 2018, after he was appointed judge of the District Court for the Western District of Tennessee by President Donald Trump.
 House District 77: Republican Rusty Grills was elected on December 19, 2019, to succeed Republican Bill Sanderson, who resigned on July 24, 2019, citing personal reasons.

Texas 
Three special elections were held for the Texas Legislature in 2019.
 House District 79: Democrat Art Fierro was elected on January 29, 2019, to succeed Democrat Joe Pickett, who resigned on January 4, 2019, citing health reasons.
 House District 125: Democrat Ray Lopez was elected in a runoff on March 12, 2019, to succeed Democrat Justin Rodriguez, who resigned on January 4, 2019, after he was appointed to the Bexar County Commissioners Court.
 House District 145: Democrat Christina Morales was elected in a runoff on March 5, 2019, to succeed Democrat Carol Alvarado, who resigned on December 21, 2018, after she was elected to the Texas Senate.

Virginia 
Two special elections were held for the Virginia General Assembly in 2019.
 Senate District 33: Democrat Jennifer Boysko was elected on January 8, 2019, to succeed Democrat Jennifer Wexton, who resigned on January 3, 2019, after she was elected to the United States House of Representatives.
 House District 86: Democrat Ibraheem Samirah was elected on February 19, 2019, to succeed Democrat Jennifer Boysko, who resigned on January 11, 2019, after she was elected to the Senate of Virginia.

Washington 
Two special elections were held for the Washington State Legislature in 2019.
 Senate District 40: Democrat Liz Lovelett was elected on November 5, 2019, to succeed Democrat Kevin Ranker, who resigned on January 9, 2019, following allegations of sexual harassment.
 House District 13-2: Republican Alex Ybarra was elected on November 5, 2019, to succeed Republican Matt Manweller, who resigned on January 14, 2019, following allegations of sexual harassment.

Wisconsin 

One special election was held for the Wisconsin Legislature in 2019.
 Assembly District 64: Democrat Tip McGuire was elected on April 30, 2019, to succeed Democrat Peter W. Barca, who resigned on January 8, 2019, after he was appointed Secretary of the Wisconsin Department of Revenue by Governor Tony Evers.

See also 
 2019 United States gubernatorial elections

Notes

References 

 
State legislative elections
State legislature elections in the United States by year